The New Beginning in Nagoya was a professional wrestling event promoted by New Japan Pro-Wrestling (NJPW). The event took place on January 22, 2023 in Nagoya, Aichi at the Aichi Prefectural Gymnasium (Dolphins Arena). It was the thirty-fourth event promoted under the NJPW The New Beginning name and the second to be held in Nagoya, after 2021.

Production

Background
NJPW held the inaugural The New Beginning event on February 15, 2011, with future events going on to take place annually in January and/or February. In 2022, New Beginning events were absent, aside from The New Beginning USA. On January 9, 2023, NJPW announced the return of New Beginning, revealing that The New Beginning In Nagoya would take place on January 22 at the Aichi Prefectural Gymnasium in Nagoya, Japan.

Storylines
The New Beginning in Osaka featured seven professional wrestling matches that involve different wrestlers from pre-existing scripted feuds and storylines. Wrestlers portray villains, heroes, or less distinguishable characters in scripted events that build tension and culminate in a wrestling match or series of matches.

At New Year Dash on January 5, 2023, Shingo Takagi become the first Provisional KOPW of 2023 after beating Toru Yano, Sho and Great-O-Khan in a Four Way match. After the bout, O-Khan would stare down Takagi, holding his RevPro Undisputed British Heavyweight Championship. Backstage, O-Khan would challenge Takagi to a match. On January 10, NJPW announced that Takagi would defend his Provisional KOPW Championship against O-Khan at The New Beginning In Nagoya. On January 12, both men chooses their stipulations with Takagi choosing a 30 count pinfall match and O-Khan choosing a mixed martial arts rules match with O-Khan's chosen stipulation winning the fan poll.

Event

The event started with a match between Togi Makabe and Toru Yano and Yuto Nakashima and Oskar Leube. In the end, Makabe clotheslined Nakashima and hit the King Kong Knee Drop for the victory. 

Next, House of Torture faced Minoru Suzuki, El Desperado, Ren Narita and Tomoaki Honma. In the end, Narita hit a northern lights suplex and connected with the Cobra Twist on Dick Togo, forcing Togo to submit.

The next match saw Chaos and Ryohei Oiwa take on TMDK. In the closing stages, Shane Haste delivered a dropkick and the Sitour powerbomb on Oiwa to pickup the victory. 

The fourth match featured Bullet Club taking on Hiroshi Tanahashi, Master Wato and Jado. Bullet Club won after El Phantasmo connected with The Sudden Death on Jado.  

Next, United Empire squared off against Just4Guys (with Taka Michinoku). In the end, Francesco Akira delivered a DDT and Will Ospreay hit the The Hidden Blade to Douki to pickup the win. 

The penultimate match saw Ryusuke Taguchi, Shota Umino, Kazuchika Okada and Yoh team up to take on Los Ingobernables de Japon. In the end, Umino delivered a pop up uppercut, the Reverse Bloody Sunday and The Death Rider, on Bushi to win the match.

Main event
The main event was Shingo Takagi defending the Provisional KOPW 2023 Championship in a Mixed Martial Arts match against Great-O-Khan. O-Khan applied a leglock on Takagi, but Takagi reached the ropes. Takaji then delivered a sliding lariat and a sleeper but O-Khan reached the ropes. O-Khan then performed a head and arm choke and a judro throw. Ospreay, unbeknownst to the referee, hit an OsCutter. O-Khan then applied a sleeper hold. Takagi escaped and hit The Last of the Dragon, and forced O-Khan to pass out with the Tazmission. After the match, Takagi called out Kazuchika Okada, telling him that he would be a double champion. Takagi then celebrated with Los Ingobernables de Japon as the show closed out.

Results

References

External links 
 Official New Japan Pro-Wrestling's website

2023 in professional wrestling
NJPW The New Beginning